Josine Henriëtte Blok (born 9 June 1953) is a Dutch classical scholar. She has been a professor of Ancient History and Classical Civilisation at Utrecht University since 2001 up until 2019.

Blok was born in Oegstgeest. She attended the gymnasium and subsequently studied history at the University of Groningen between 1971 and 1978. In October 1991, she obtained her PhD at Leiden University under professor , with a thesis titled: "Amazones antianeirai. Interpretaties van de Amazonenmythe in het mythologisch onderzoek van de 19e en 20e eeuw en in archaïsch Griekenland". In 2001, Blok was appointed professor at Utrecht University.

In 2003, Blok was awarded a Vici grant by the Netherlands Organisation for Scientific Research for research on citizenship in Classical Athens. She was elected a member of the Royal Netherlands Academy of Arts and Sciences in 2011.

References

External links
 Profile at Utrecht University

1953 births
Living people
Classical scholars of Utrecht University
Dutch classical scholars
Women classical scholars
Leiden University alumni
Members of the Royal Netherlands Academy of Arts and Sciences
People from Oegstgeest
University of Groningen alumni